3TK4 (3 Teens Kill 4) was a musical group based in the East Village of New York City in the 1980s. They are most notable for featuring David Wojnarowicz, a famous artist, as a member.

History 
In 1980, Brian Butterick, Jesse Hultberg and David Wojnarowicz worked as busboys at New York City's Danceteria on West 37th street, 
before the club was closed down for not having a liquor license.
The Danceteria staff party was held at TR3 in Soho in December, 1980, and was 3 Teens Kill 4 No Motive's first performance. 
The poet Max Blagg chose the name from a New York Post headline, and performed with them along with others from Danceteria.

Julie Hair joined the band for their 3rd show adding her rhythm machine making 3 Teens Kill 4 a stripped-down, 4-person ensemble.
The band's signature style of found-sounds played on hand-held tape recorders, toy instruments, spoken word and multi-vocals, in a pop music context took shape.
The low-tech tape sounds achieved the same results as sampling, and tape-looping, which were just starting to enter the pop music genre.

As the band's only released album was getting started, the inclusion of Doug Bressler expanded the instrumentation to actual guitars as well as toys and Casios.
Guitar, bass, keyboard, percussion, tape players, and toys were passed around on stage. Clarinet and flute were also used as was a microphone sewed into a glove, and a can of Beans.
The band's performances had an anarchic intensity that relied on ambiance, and surprising sounds, more than actual music.

In 1982, Alan Mace and Bobby Bradley, the managers of the Pyramid club, financed the self-titled, independently released album, 3 Teens Kill 4 No Motive.
A cover of Chaka Kahn's Tell Me Something Good (written by Stevie Wonder), included the newscast of the attempted assassination of Ronald Reagan.
3 Teens Kill 4's deconstructed version was typical of the harsh, reality-based attitude in their songs. 
Apart from rock clubs, they performed in non-rock venues such as the Civilian Warfare Gallery, Wigstock, and White Columns.
The East Village, Manhattan was in its heyday of art and music.

In 1983, Wojnarowicz left the band pursuing visual art, writing and film-making. 
He continued to collaborate on various projects with the members of 3 Teens Kill 4 before his death in 1992.

In 1984, Bill Gerstel joined the ranks and for the first time the band had a drummer.
They continued recording and performing for the next 3 years sharing the stage with a long list of artists from this era.
DNA, James Chance, Bush Tetras, Soundgarden, Wall of Voodoo, Glenn Branca, Sonic Youth, ESG, Certain General, The Del-Byzanteens, Suicide, and Madonna.
The band dispersed in 1987. All of the members continued writing, performing, producing art and recording.

3 Teens Kill 4 reunited in 2010 at the Mudd Club/Club 57/New Wave Vaudeville show at New York's Delancey Street Lounge.
That night included the Bush Tetras, Tish and Snooky, The Comateens and Richard Lloyd from Television.

In 2011, a multi-media show of music, dance, film, slides and live art called In Peace & War: 3 Teens Kill 4 had 3 nights at New York's HOWL Festival.
The band was joined on stage by choreographer Ishmael Houston-Jones and Antony of Antony and the Johnsons along with numerous other artists, dancers and singers.
The rarely seen film Beautiful People by Wojnarowicz was screened.

In 2016, Bill Gerstel, the band's very human drummer, died after a long battle with cancer.

In 2018, the re-released album 3 Teens Kill No Motive was included as a sound installation at the Whitney Museum's retrospective for David Wojnarowicz called History Keeps Me Awake At Night. The exhibit continued in 2019 in Europe.

The band did their last performance on September 26, 2018, for the closing of History Keeps Me Awake At Night at the Whitney Museum of American Art.

Beloved co-founder Brian Butterick (aka Hattie Hathaway) died on January 30, 2019, after a 6-month battle with lung cancer.

Members 
 Doug Bressler
 Brian Butterick (1956-2019)
 William Gerstel (1951-2016)
 Julie Hair
 Jesse Hultberg
 David Wojnarowicz (1954-1992)

Discography

No Motive
Recorded in 1982, released on Point Blank Records.

Track listing
Side one
"Hold Up"
"Tell Me Something Good"
"5/4"

Side two
"Crime Drama"
"Hut/Bean Song"
"Hunger"

Re-released on French label L'invitation au Suicide in Europe 1984.
Included a booklet and the additional song "Circumscript" produced by Lefforts Brown

Re-mastered and re-released on vinyl by Dark Entries Records in June, 2017 with 3 never-before-heard songs 
thus turning the album into a 10-track LP.

Side one
"Hold Up"
"Tell Me Something Good"
"5/4"
"Crime Drama"
"Stay and Fight"

Side two
"Circumscript"
"Hut/Bean Song"
"Hunger"
"Visitation"
"Desire"

References

External links
More info about 3TK4
Interview with Jesse Hultberg
www.wigstock.nu
Video of the band performing at the Mudd Club reunion in 2010

Musical groups from New York (state)